Harvey L. Johnson (Cleburne, Texas, September 12, 1904 - May 29, 1995), was an American scholar of Latin America, professor and radio broadcaster. The Southwest Council of Latin American Studies' Harvey L. Johnson Award is named after him.

Broadcasting
Hello Neighbor 22 program cultural program

References

Academics from Texas
1904 births
1995 deaths